Sandstone is a sedimentary rock composed mainly of sand-size mineral or rock grains.

Sandstone may also refer to:

Place names
Australia
 Sandstone, Western Australia
 Sandstone Gold Mine, a gold mine in Western Australia.
Canada
 Sandstone Valley, Calgary
United States
 Sandstone Charter Township, Michigan
 Sandstone, Minnesota
 Sandstone Township, Pine County, Minnesota
 Sandstone, Missouri
 Sandstone, West Virginia
 Sandstone Bluff, Wisconsin

Other uses
 Sandstone Amphitheater, outdoor theater in Kansas City, Kansas
 Sandstone Estates, agricultural enterprise and a technology museum in South Africa
 Sandstone Ranch (Nevada), historic place in Clark County, Nevada
 Sandstone Retreat, 1970s clothing-optional, open sexuality resort in California
 Sandstone Trail, a long-distance walkers' path in England
 Sandstone Universities, an informally defined group comprising Australia's oldest tertiary education institutions
 Operation Sandstone was the third series of American nuclear weapon tests in 1948
Sandstone (2004), the first novel in James Rollins' SIGMA Force Series
 Sandstone (company), a private intelligence firm

See also
 Sandstone Solar Energy Project, a planned solar power plant in Nevada, United States